Usermaatre Akhenamun Ramesses VIII (also written Ramses and Rameses) or Ramesses Sethherkhepshef Meryamun ('Set is his Strength, beloved of Amun') (reigned 1130–1129 BC, or 1130 BC), was the seventh Pharaoh of the Twentieth Dynasty of the New Kingdom of Egypt, and was the 9th of the 10 sons of Ramesses III.

Reign
Ramesses VIII is the most obscure ruler of this Dynasty, and the current information from his brief kingship suggests that he lasted on the throne for one year at the most. The fact that he succeeded to power after the death of Ramesses VII —his half-nephew and a son of Ramesses VI—may indicate a continuing problem in the royal succession. Ramesses VIII was a son of Ramesses III.

Ramesses VIII's Prenomen, Usermaatre Akhenamun, means "Powerful is the maat of Ra, Effective for Amun." Monuments from his reign are scarce, and consist primarily of an inscription at Medinet Habu, a mention of this ruler in one document — Berlin stele 2081 of Hori at Abydos — and one scarab. His only known date is a Year 1, I Peret day 2 graffito in the tomb of Kyenebu (Theban Tomb 113) at Thebes.  According to Erik Hornung in a 2006 book, the accession date of Ramesses VIII has been established by Amin Amer to date to an eight-month interval between I Peret day 2 and I Season of the Inundation day 13.

The tomb inscription notes that it took 3½ months, from Year 1, I Akhet day 13 of Ramesses VIII, to start work and paint scenes on a tomb chapel in Kyenebu's tomb, and up until Year 1, I Peret day 2 to complete the work. Since no year change occurs in this time interval, the accession date for Ramesses VIII must fall outside this period of this text, "i.e., within I Peret 3 to I Akhet 12."

Burial
He is the sole pharaoh of the Twentieth Dynasty whose tomb has not been definitely identified in the Valley of the Kings, though some scholars have suggested that the tomb of Prince Mentuherkhepshef, KV19, the son of Ramesses IX, was originally started for Ramesses VIII but proved unsuitable when he became a king in his own right.  An all-Egyptian team of researchers headed by Afifi Rohiem under the supervision of Dr. Zahi Hawass were looking for the pharaoh's tomb. Work on the tomb of Ramesses VIII might have started before he ascended the throne, when he was known as prince Sethherkhepshef, as suggested by an ostracon discovered in the Valley of the Queens.

Before he became Pharaoh, the tomb QV43 in the Valley of the Queens was constructed for him, however, the tomb was never used.

References

12th-century BC Pharaohs
Pharaohs of the Twentieth Dynasty of Egypt
Year of birth unknown
1120s BC deaths
Ramesses III